Turenne (1611–1675) was the French military leader Henri de la Tour d'Auvergne, Vicomte de Turenne.

Turenne also may refer to:
 Turenne, Corrèze, French town
 Turenne, a.k.a. Sabra, Algeria, site of Turenne rail accident, 1932 
 Turenne (name), surname, and names and titles "... de Turenne"

See also 
 Château de Turenne, French castle
 Viscounts of Turenne and princes of Sedan in junior line of House of La Tour d'Auvergne